Daniel Boucher may refer to:

Daniel Boucher (musician) (born 1971), Québécois musician
Daniel Boucher (politician), Québecois politician